Solveig Lára Guðmundsdóttir (born 1956) is an Icelandic prelate who currently serves as the Bishop of Hólar.

Biography
Solveig Lára completed a diploma in theology in 1983 and has graduated in Christian reflection and psychology in Germany in 1999 and in serving leadership and leadership training for women by the Lutheran World Federation in 2010. She became a deputy clergyman in Bústaðapakkarak in 1983, became a parish priest at Seltjarnarnes in 1986 and a parish priest at Möðruvöllum in Hörgárdalur in 2000. Solveig Lára is married to Gylfi Jónsson. They have four children and three grandchildren.

Bishop
Solveig Lára was elected bishop with 96 votes compared with 70 for her contender Kristján Björnsson. She was consecrated bishop on 12 August 2012 in Hólar Cathedral by the Bishop of Iceland Agnes M. Sigurðardóttir. She was installed as bishop on 1 September. She succeeded Jón Aðalsteinn Baldvinsson as Bishop of Hólar and suffragan to the Bishop of Iceland in the Diocese of Iceland. She was the second woman to be consecrated bishop in Iceland.

References

Living people
Women Lutheran bishops
21st-century Lutheran bishops
Solveig Lara Gudmundsdottir
1956 births